Hải Dương is a province in the Red River Delta of northern Vietnam. Its name derives from Sino-Vietnamese  "ocean sun", though the modern province is in fact landlocked. Located in the Northern Key Economic Region, Hai Duong Province has a dynamic economy with a focus on industrial manufacturing.

Name
Hải Dương is Sino-Vietnamese for "ocean sun" (海陽). The name first appeared officially in 1498. In feudal times, Hải Dương indicated a vast area from east of Hanoi to the South China Sea. The area corresponded to all of modern Hải Dương, Hải Phòng, most of Hưng Yên and the southwestern corner of Quảng Ninh.

Geography
The province is located in the Red River Delta of north-eastern Vietnam, about mid-distance from Hanoi to Haiphong. Two famous pagodas, Côn Sơn and Kiếp Bạc, are situated in this province. The province is known for its lychees and for the traditional sweet bánh đậu xanh (mung bean paste).

Hải Dương is located in the center of North Vietnam. The natural area of the province is 1,661.2 km2, the 51st largest in Vietnam. Hải Dương province borders six provinces: Bắc Ninh, Bắc Giang and Quảng Ninh in the north; Hưng Yên in the west; Hải Phòng in the east; and Thái Bình to the south.

There are important roads and railways running through the province, including Highways No. 5, No. 18, No. 183 and No. 37.

Administrative divisions
Hải Dương is subdivided into 12 district-level sub-divisions:

 9 districts:
 Bình Giang
 Cẩm Giàng
 Gia Lộc
 Kim Thành
 Nam Sách
 Ninh Giang
 Thanh Hà
 Thanh Miện
 Tứ Kỳ
 1 district-level town:
 Kinh Môn
 2 provincial cities:
 Chí Linh
 Hải Dương (capital)

They are further subdivided into 13 commune-level towns (or townlets), 227 communes, and 25 wards.

Climate
Hải Dương has a tropical monsoon climate with typical cold winter, potential heat and high humidity. The prevailing winds come from the southeast and northeast. The climate is divided into four distinct seasons. From early February to early April, there is a transition period between the dry and wet seasons in which there is spray and rain. The rainy season lasts from April to October.
The average temperature 23.3 °C.
The average amount of sunshine annually is 1,524 hours.
The average relative humidity is between 85 and 87%.

Demography
 Over the last 20 years, Hải Dương province has been experiencing a big change in its demographics. During this period, the rate of fertility decreased dramatically from a high rate at 6.7% to 2.14% between 2000 and 2008. The same pattern is found with the mortality rate. This is a result of the success of the family planning program and the improvement of the health care system in the province as well as innovations in medicine. In addition, life expectancy also increased over time. These changes have taken place at a speed that is much quicker than the world average rate and the rate of many other places in Asia.
 The number of persons aged 60 years or older in Hải Dương province is estimated to be 600,000 in 2010. This number is projected to grow to nearly 800,000 by 2050, at which time it will be equal to the population of children under 15. This historic crossover of an increasing share of older persons and a declining share of children will mark the first time that the number of children and older persons are the same.
 There are many ethnic groups of which the Kinh make up 99% of the population. Major religions include Buddhism, Catholicism and Protestantism of Christianity, Confucianism, Caodaism and the Hòa Hảo faith. With that being said, ancestor worship is probably the predominant "religion", although they may not realize it.

History
Hải Dương is located in the Red River Delta and originated from the civilization of the Red River. Hải Dương has had many name changes throughout history, such as Dương Tuyền (in the period of the Hùng kings), Giao Chỉ and Giao Châu (in the 1st millennium), Nam Sách Lo, Hồng Lo (under the Ly and Trần dynasties), Hồng Châu, Nam Sách (in the 16th century), Thừa tuyên and Hải Dương (in the 10th year of Quang Thuận's reign).
Hải Dương province was established in 1831 and was first called "Thành Đông" (East Province) which means "the city to the east of Thăng Long citadel".
In the early 20th century, the patriotic movement was expanded in Hải Dương.
In the 1930s, the Hải Dương people carried out two resistance wars against the imperial French and American empires and then achieved victory after prolonged fighting.
In 1968, Hải Dương was merged with Hưng Yên to become Hải Hưng Province.
In January 1997, Hải Hưng was separated into Hải Dương and Hưng Yên.
In August 1997, the government decided to upgrade Hải Dương from a town to city status. Since 1997, Hải Dương has had 11 districts and a city.

Economy
Located in the Northern Key Economic Region, Hai Duong Province has a dynamic economy with a focus on industrial manufacturing.

 Hải Dương province is located in the center of the Red River Delta, which has good conditions in transportation, agriculture and industrial production. Hải Dương province has an important role in the social economic development of the country. Its natural land area and sources are favorable for developing the economy. More than 800,000 of the 1.7 million people are employed, with over 500,000 employed in the agriculture industry. This is a benefit for the social and economic development of Hải Dương.
 Hải Dương has prioritized developing agriculture and industrial production. Hải Dương received domestic and international investment in over 50 industrial areas in the whole province. There are foreign business partners from places such as Britain, Germany, France and Hong Kong. Hải Dương also developed agriculture in the direction of economic, industrialization and modernization.
 For the past few years, Hải Dương has provided big cities such as Hanoi, Haiphong, and also consumers throughout Vietnam, with special produce such as lychee or traditional specialties such as green bean cake.
 In recent years, agriculture in Hải Dương has developed quickly and steadily.

Population and new urban areas

Population
 According to the Hải Dương Statistical Yearbook 2008, Hải Dương has an area of 1,651.8 km2, with a population of 1,732,814. The population density is 1,049 per/km2. The average population in 2007 by sex and by region is as follows:
 By sex: Male: 842,002; female: 890,812
 By region: Urban: 279,850; rural: 1,452,964
 The rate of population growth:
 Whole province: 9.60%
 Urban: 10.38%
 Rural: 9.50%
Number of people at working age: 1,094,272

New urban areas
Presently Hải Dương City has two new urban areas. The first one is located in eastern Hải Dương, with an area of 108 ha and consists of two wards: Ngọc Châu and Hải Tân. The second is in western Hải Dương, and has an area of 433 ha. It is located in the territory of Thanh Bình ward and Tứ Minh commune. Both of the two new urban areas are invested by Nam Cuong Group. Currently there are many families living here but the cost of land and the cost of building the homes is quite high in comparison with living standard in Hải Dương. The two new urban area expanding Hải Dương City is one of main reasons Hải Dương City became a second level city on May 16, 2009.

Education system 
Hải Dương's education system is divided into 5 phases: pre-primary, primary, intermediate, secondary, and higher education, as the national education system suggests.

 Pre-primary for children from 2 to 5 years old to form thinking for children and creating the daily habits needed for this age group, although not all children must learn at this level.
 Primary school starts at age 6, consisting of 5 levels, from grades 1 to 5. This is a grade school and is required for all students.
 Level II of intermediate school includes 4 levels, from grades 6 to 9. Students must learn Mathematics, Physics, Chemistry (grades 8 and 9), Biology, Informative Technology, written language, History, Geography, Civic Education, Foreign Language, Health, Parenting, Music and Visual Arts.
In addition students have some additional requirements such as education outside the classroom on time management, direction of education (grade 9) and use of school. To study at higher levels students must participate in the examination enrollment process.
 Level III of secondary school consists of 3 levels, from grades 10 to 12. To graduate level III, students must participate in the graduation exam for secondary schools of education and training.
Students wanting to study in public schools must attend an examination of birth. The exam is held every year, by the Department of Education and Training at the local level. At this level, students also study subjects similar to middle school. However, students in secondary school also take a number of other activities such as business and vocational.

At present Hải Dương provincial education consists of:
1 Department of Education and Training
12 Offices of Education
13 Education Centers
12 Vocational Centers

There are a number of schools, listed by province and type:

Public health
Hải Dương was one of the first six provinces in Vietnam to construct a public safety program for children. A public safety site for children was constructed in Đức Chính village, Cẩm Giàng district. As the injury/accident rate amongst children had decreased significantly after only one year, this experimental trial project seems to have had a positive impact.

Hải Dương city has a public general hospital on Nguyễn Lương Bằng street.

Transportation
12 year ago (1997), nobody in Hải Dương province believed that the agricultural products of Hải Dương Province, after a few hours of being transported, could be readied for sale in Hanoi. Nowadays, however, it only takes about one hour to go to Hanoi from Hải Dương. This big change is due to the outstanding development in the traffic network.
In fact, transport in Hải Dương province developed very fast. During the last 5 years, the whole land transportation in Hải Dương was upgraded and improved with various projects. In 1999, the National Road No. 5 connecting Hanoi and Haiphong was upgraded to first-class status.
Today, there are 649 km of roads under the central management including National Road Nos. 5, 18, 183 and 37 that have been completely built or upgraded. These roads are favorable for traveling and goods transportation within the Hải Dương province. Furthermore, there are 11 provincial asphalt land routes with a total length of 258 km and 27 land routes at district level with a total length of 352 km, of which 70% have been asphalt.
Hải Dương has 10 waterways with a total length of nearly 300 km under the central management and six waterways with a total length of 140 km under local management. However, most of the transport operations on these waterways have not been planned yet.
Hải Dương also has 70 km of railway (including 15 km of railways serving for the Phả Lại company)

Media, culture, and entertainment
At present, Hải Dương has one provincial newspaper, publishing daily, weekend, and monthly editions. There are additional magazines published by different departments of the province in related fields. E-newspapers such as at www.haiduong.gov.vn and www.truyenhinhhaiduong.com.vn have made it easier to get information about the province than ever before.

Hải Dương Provincial People's Voice and Television Broadcasting Center is known as one of the most developed in the northern region. Cable TV networks have also been installed, providing customers with more than 40 international channels.

Hải Dương is famous for being a "sacred land with pre-eminent people" with hundreds of well-known historical, cultural relics and scenic beauty areas such as Côn Sơn - Kiếp Bạc, Nguyễn Trãi Temple and Chi Lăng Nam Storks island. The province is also a place of many traditional handicraft villages with well-known products for centuries. Cultural festivals are organized annually during spring and autumn, attracting visitors from all over the nation.

Hải Dương has over 100 hotels ranging from 2 stars to 4 stars and many are motels or guest-houses. Restaurants serving traditional food can be found on almost every street in the city center, but visitors may also enjoy foreign cuisines at specialty restaurants around Bạch Đằng Lake. International restaurants are getting more popular and choices expanding, and you may find Chinese, Korean, and Japanese restaurants here.

Cuisine
Bánh đậu xanh, a sweet mung bean cake, and Rượu Phú Lộc are local specialties.

References

 
Provinces of Vietnam